In human anatomy, the radial (RCL) and ulnar (UCL) collateral ligaments of the metacarpophalangeal joints (MCP) of the hand are the primary stabilisers of the MCP joints. They have two parts: the cord-like collateral ligaments proper located more dorsally and the accessory collateral ligaments located more volarly. They enable us to spread our fingers with an open hand but not with the hand closed into a fist.

Origin and insertion 
The collateral ligaments originate on depressions on each side of the metacarpal heads dorsal to axis of rotation.  From there, they extend obliquely and distally to their insertions onto tubercles at the base of the proximal phalanx.  The accessory collateral ligaments originate volar to the collateral ligaments and are inserted on the palmar plate.

Function 
Due to the relation between their insertions on the sides of the metacarpal head and the axis of rotation in the joint, the collateral ligaments are taut in flexion but lax in extension, while the accessory collateral ligaments are lax in flexion but taut in extension. The collateral ligaments are lengthened 3–4 mm when the joint flexes 0-80° while the accessory collateral ligaments are shortened 1–2 mm.  During hyperextension the accessory ligaments are lengthened while the proper ligaments are shortened. As a result, the joint is stable during full flexion while the relaxed collateral ligaments allows lateral and rotation movements during extension.

The tendons of interosseous and lumbricales add to the lateral stability of the joint.

References 

Ligaments of the upper limb